Lithops hallii is a species of living stone (Lithops) which is native to Southern Africa. It is a species of the genus Lithops under the family Aizoaceae.

Description 
The leaves are reddish-brown with milky whites or grays, and have channels of blood-red to dark brown running along the top of the leaves. Flowers are white and sprout from the fissure between the two leaves.

References 

hallii